The Open Air Glyptotheque, Psychiko, also called George Zongolopoulos Square, is a sculpture garden located in Psychiko, Athens, Greece.

The sculpture garden was established in 2010 when the Municipality of Filothei-Psychiko and the George Zongolopoulos Foundation, also based in Psychiko, wished to honor the Greek sculptor George Zongolopoulos by giving his name to one of the municipality's central squares and creating an open-air glyptotheque freely accessible to the public. Zongolopoulos and his wife, the painter Eleni Paschalidou-Zongolopoulou, were amongst the first inhabitants of Psychiko.

There are six large-scale sculptures by Zongolopoulos in Psychiko, as well as Umbrellas at the entrance of Psychiko on Kifissias Avenue. The sculptures in the square are representative of his different creative periods and include Alexander, Poseidon, Sculpture of TITF (Thessaloniki International Trade Fair), Olympic Circles, Column and Irana.

References

2010 establishments in Greece
Outdoor sculptures
Sculpture gardens, trails and parks in Europe
Tourist attractions in Athens